Dusty Rhodes (1945–2015) was an American professional wrestler

Dusty Rhodes may also refer to:

Sports
 Dusty Rhodes (footballer) (1882–1960), English association football player
 Dusty Rhodes (cricketer) (1916–1983), English cricketer and umpire
 Dusty Rhodes (outfielder) (1927–2009), Major League Baseball player
 Dusty Rhodes (pitcher), Negro leagues baseball player
 Dusty Rhodes (baseball coach) (born 1946), former head coach of the North Florida Ospreys baseball team
 Dusty Rhodes Tag Team Classic, a yearly tournament created in 2015 named after the wrestler

Publishing
 Dusty Rhodes (author), American author
 Thomas L. Rhodes (1939–2018), American political editor and president of National Review

Other
 Raleigh Rhodes (1918–2007), American World War II fighter pilot
 Robert Fripp (born 1946), guitarist who used the pseudonym "Dusty Rhodes"
 Dusty Rhodes (music producer), (fl. 1960s), country music producer on Willis Alan Ramsey

See also
Bob Rhoads (1879–1967), Major League Baseball pitcher nicknamed "Dusty"
Dustin Rhodes (born 1969), known professionally as Goldust, Dustin Runnels or Dusty Rhodes Jr., son of previously-mentioned wrestler
Dusty Rhodes and the River Band, an indie rock group from Anaheim, California
Dusty Roads (disambiguation)